Bent Melchior (24 June 1929 – 28 July 2021) was a chief rabbi of Denmark.

Life and career
Melchior was born to Danish parents in the German city of Beuthen (now Bytom in Poland), where his father, Marcus Melchior, was rabbi. In 1943, during the Nazi German occupation of Denmark, Marcus Melchior was instrumental in saving Danish Jews, and became chief rabbi of Denmark in 1947. From October 1943 to mid 1945, Melchior and his family lived as refugees in Sweden. Melchior served as a soldier in the 1947–1949 Palestine war, beginning in pre-statehood battles in 1947. Subsequently, at the age of 21, he received a Ph.D. from Copenhagen University.

After a period as a teacher in Copenhagen Melchior had his rabbinical education in London. In 1963 he became rabbi at the synagogue in Copenhagen. When his father died in 1969, he succeeded him as chief rabbi. He translated the Pentateuch, the Siddur (Jewish prayer book) and other books into Danish, as well as writing several books including his autobiography. He was a prolific speaker and writer in the Danish community and media. 

Melchior retired from the rabbinate in 1996. His successor was Bent Lexner. In retirement Melchior continued his humanitarian and charitable work in Denmark and abroad.

Personal life
Bent Melchior married Lilian Weissdorf in 1951. The couple had four sons, including Michael Melchior. His grandson Jair Melchior is currently the chief rabbi of Denmark.

References

External links
Chief Rabbis of Denmark

1929 births
2021 deaths
Danish Orthodox rabbis
20th-century rabbis
Bent
University of Copenhagen alumni